1857   is a 1946 Indian Bollywood film. It was the fifth highest grossing Indian film of 1946. The film was directed by Mohan Sinha for Murari Pictures. The story was by M. Zahur with screenplay and dialogue by Safdar 'Ah'. The film starred the singer-actor pair of Surendra and Suraiya, along with Wasti, Nigar, Munshi Khanjar, Madan Puri.

1857 was a historical fiction drama set against the backdrop of the Indian Rebellion of 1857 also known as the First war of independence.

Cast

Male
 Surendra as Aslam
 Wasti as Navab Aghashouqat
 Benjamin as Jawahir Singh
 Shakir as Nawab Khurshid Mirza
 Shyam Sunder as Manzoor
 Ganju as Bahadur Shah
 Y. N. Joshi as Dileep
 Madanpuri as Prince Mirza Mughal
 Munshikhanjar as father of Manzoor

Female 
 Suraiya as Tasnim
 Menka as Begum
 Nigar as mother of Manzoor
 Lila as sister of Manzoor
 Laxmi as Queen of Jhanshi
Dances
Kundanlal

Soundtrack
The music composer was Sajjad Hussain and the lyricists were Anuum Pilibhiti, Pandit Ankur, Shewan Rizvi, and Y.N.Joshi. The singers were Suraiya, Surendra, Shamshad Begum, Khan Mastana and Rajkumari.

Song List

References

External links
 
 Audio of 1857 At Surjit Singh's posted songs

1946 films
Films about the Indian Rebellion of 1857
1940s Hindi-language films
Films scored by Sajjad Hussain
Indian drama films
1946 drama films
Indian black-and-white films
Hindi-language drama films